The OTC Satellite Earth Station Carnarvon, an Earth station in Australia, was established to meet the need for more reliable and higher quality communications for the Apollo program. NASA contracted Australia's Overseas Telecommunications Commission (OTC) "to provide an earth station near Carnarvon, Western Australia to link the NASA tracking station in that area to the control centre in the USA", also contracting COMSAT to launch three Intelsat-2 communications satellites.

Television and NASA-assist operations
The "sugar scoop" antenna became operational on 29 October 1966 when Intelsat-2A, the first of the three satellites launched, gave OTC and the Australian Broadcasting Commission a brief chance to test satellite television communications as the satellite drifted to ignominious failure over the Indian Ocean. On 24 November 1966, test patterns for the first live telecasts from Australia to England were successful. The next day, a live BBC television broadcast from a studio in London featured interviews linking UK families with their British migrant relatives standing in Robinson Street, Carnarvon.

The "sugar scoop" became famous again on 21 July 1969, the day of the Apollo 11 Moon landing, relaying Neil Armstrong's first steps on the Moon from NASA's Honeysuckle Creek Tracking Station, Canberra, to Perth's TV audience via Moree earth station - the first live telecast into Western Australia.

The OTC station's eight years of communications support for the Carnarvon Tracking Station began on 4 February 1967, three weeks after Intelsat-2B was launched. A larger parabolic antenna was commissioned in late 1969 to upgrade the support for the later Apollo missions. OTC continued to provide communications support for NASA space programs until the NASA station closed early in 1975. Thereafter it tracked some NASA missions on its own account.

Contract tracking operations
During OTC's last years of operation in Carnarvon, multiple tracking contracts were completed including:
 prime responsibility for controlling the European Space Agency (ESA) Giotto mission probe which sampled the tail of Halley's Comet
 launch support for ESA missions and for the Indian Space Agency's first satellite
 tracking of German TV and communication satellites
 assistance with the launch and orbital parking of Meteorsat for Africa
 guiding the Marecs communications satellite
 monitoring the launch of the Japanese geosynchronous marine observation satellite, MOS-1, in February 1987

Decommission
The station was decommissioned in April 1987, but the site is still actively involved in solar scientific research, hosting a node of the Birmingham Solar Oscillations Network. In 2022 the OTC antenna was acquired by ThothX Australia, who plan to refurbish it into a deep space radar.

"OTC Satellite Earth Station Carnarvon (fmr)" is a registered heritage site with the Heritage Council of Western Australia. It has local, national and international cultural-heritage significance.

The Carnarvon Space and Technology Museum opened in 2012.

References

 
 
 OTVA Website
 exOTC website and Carnarvon construction images and information
 Information courtesy Paul Dench, ex Chief Engineer and contractor Company Manager of the Carnarvon Tracking Station

External links
 
 Carnarvon Space and Technology Museum
 

Earth stations in Western Australia
Radio telescopes
Shire of Carnarvon
NASA facilities in Australia
1966 establishments in Australia
1975 disestablishments in Australia
State Register of Heritage Places in the Shire of Carnarvon